Grosskost is a surname. Notable people with the surname include:

Arlette Grosskost (born 1953), French politician
Charly Grosskost (1944–2004), French cyclist